Lepidochrysops is a genus of butterflies in the family Lycaenidae. The members (species) are found in the 
Afrotropical realm.

Species
Lepidochrysops aethiopia (Bethune-Baker, [1923])
Lepidochrysops abri Libert & Collins, 2001
Lepidochrysops albilinea Tite, 1959
Lepidochrysops anerius (Hulstaert, 1924)
Lepidochrysops ansorgei Tite, 1959
Lepidochrysops arabicus Gabriel, 1954
Lepidochrysops asteris (Godart, [1824])
Lepidochrysops auratus Quickelberge, 1979
Lepidochrysops australis Tite, 1964
Lepidochrysops azureus (Butler, 1879)
Lepidochrysops bacchus Riley, 1938
Lepidochrysops badhami van Son, 1956
Lepidochrysops balli Dickson, 1985
Lepidochrysops barnesi Pennington, 1953
Lepidochrysops braueri Dickson, 1966
Lepidochrysops budama Someren, 1957
Lepidochrysops caerulea Tite, 1961
Lepidochrysops carsoni (Butler, 1901)
Lepidochrysops chala Kielland, 1980
Lepidochrysops chalceus Quickelberge, 1979
Lepidochrysops chittyi Henning & Henning, 1994
Lepidochrysops chloauges (Bethune-Baker, 1923)
Lepidochrysops cinerea (Bethune-Baker, [1923])
Lepidochrysops coxii Pinhey, 1945
Lepidochrysops cupreus (Neave, 1910)
Lepidochrysops delicata (Bethune-Baker, [1923])
Lepidochrysops desmondi Stempffer, 1951
Lepidochrysops dollmani (Bethune-Baker, [1923])
Lepidochrysops dukei Cottrell, 1965
Lepidochrysops dunni Larsen & Collins, 2003
Lepidochrysops elgonae Stempffer, 1950
Lepidochrysops erici Gardiner, 2003
Lepidochrysops evae Gardiner, 2003
Lepidochrysops flavisquamosa Tite, 1959
Lepidochrysops forsskali Larsen, 1982
Lepidochrysops fulvescens Tite, 1961
Lepidochrysops fumosa (Butler, 1886)
Lepidochrysops glauca (Trimen, 1887)
Lepidochrysops grahami (Trimen, 1893)
Lepidochrysops grandis Talbot, 1937
Lepidochrysops guichardi Gabriel, 1949
Lepidochrysops gydoae Dickson & Wykeham, 1994
Lepidochrysops handmani Quickelberge, 1980
Lepidochrysops haveni Larsen, 1983
Lepidochrysops hawkeri (Talbot, 1929)
Lepidochrysops heathi Gardiner, 1998
Lepidochrysops hypopolia (Trimen, 1887)
Lepidochrysops ignota (Trimen, 1887)
Lepidochrysops intermedia (Bethune-Baker, [1923])
Lepidochrysops inyangae Pinhey, 1945
Lepidochrysops irvingi (Swanepoel, 1948)
Lepidochrysops jacksoni van Someren, 1957
Lepidochrysops jamesi Swanepoel, 1971
Lepidochrysops jansei van Someren, 1957
Lepidochrysops jefferyi (Swierstra, 1909)
Lepidochrysops kennethi Kielland, 1986
Lepidochrysops ketsi Cottrell, 1965
Lepidochrysops kilimanjarensis (Strand, 1909)
Lepidochrysops kitale (Stempffer, 1936)
Lepidochrysops koaena (Strand, 1911)
Lepidochrysops kocak Seven, 1997
Lepidochrysops labeensis Larsen & Warren-Gash, 2000
Lepidochrysops labwor van Someren, 1957
Lepidochrysops lerothodi (Trimen, 1904)
Lepidochrysops letsea (Trimen, 1870)
Lepidochrysops leucon (Mabille, 1879)
Lepidochrysops littoralis Swanepoel & Vári, 1983
Lepidochrysops loewensteini (Swanepoel, 1951)
Lepidochrysops longifalces Tite, 1961
Lepidochrysops lotana Swanepoel, 1962
Lepidochrysops loveni (Aurivillius, 1922)
Lepidochrysops lukenia van Someren, 1957
Lepidochrysops lunulifer (Ungemach, 1932)
Lepidochrysops mashuna (Trimen, 1894)
Lepidochrysops mcgregori Pennington, 1970
Lepidochrysops methymna (Trimen, 1862)
Lepidochrysops michaeli Gardiner, 2003
Lepidochrysops michellae Henning & Henning, 1983
Lepidochrysops miniata Gardiner, 2004
Lepidochrysops mpanda Tite, 1961
Lepidochrysops nacrescens Tite, 1961
Lepidochrysops neavei (Bethune-Baker, [1923])
Lepidochrysops negus (C. & R. Felder, [1865])
Lepidochrysops neonegus (Bethune-Baker, [1923])
Lepidochrysops nigritia Tite, 1959
Lepidochrysops nyika Tite, 1961
Lepidochrysops oosthuizeni Swanepoel & Vári, 1983
Lepidochrysops oreas Tite, 1964

Lepidochrysops ortygia (Trimen, 1887)
Lepidochrysops outeniqua Swanepoel & Vári, 1983
Lepidochrysops pampolis (Druce, 1905)
Lepidochrysops parsimon (Fabricius, 1775)

Lepidochrysops patricia (Trimen, 1887)
Lepidochrysops peculiaris (Rogenhofer, 1891)
Lepidochrysops penningtoni Dickson, 1969
Lepidochrysops pephredo (Trimen, 1889)
Lepidochrysops phoebe Libert, 2001
Lepidochrysops pittawayi Larsen, 1983

Lepidochrysops plebeja (Butler, 1898)
Lepidochrysops polydialecta (Bethune-Baker, [1923])
Lepidochrysops poseidon Pringle, 1987
Lepidochrysops praeterita Swanepoel, 1962
Lepidochrysops pringlei Dickson, 1982

Lepidochrysops procera (Trimen, 1893)
Lepidochrysops pterou (Bethune-Baker, [1923])
Lepidochrysops puncticilia (Trimen, 1883)
Lepidochrysops quassi (Karsch, 1895)
Lepidochrysops quickelbergei Swanepoel, 1969
Lepidochrysops reichenowii (Dewitz, 1879)
Lepidochrysops rhodesensae (Bethune-Baker, [1923])
Lepidochrysops ringa Tite, 1959
Lepidochrysops robertsoni Cottrell, 1965
Lepidochrysops rossouwi Henning & Henning, 1994
Lepidochrysops ruthica Pennington, 1953
Lepidochrysops skotios (Druce, 1905)
Lepidochrysops solwezii (Bethune-Baker, 1923)
Lepidochrysops southeyae Pennington, 1967
Lepidochrysops stormsi (Robbe, 1892)
Lepidochrysops subvariegata Talbot, 1935
Lepidochrysops swanepoeli Pennington, 1948
Lepidochrysops swartbergensis Swanepoel, 1969
Lepidochrysops synchrematiza (Bethune-Baker, [1923])
Lepidochrysops tantalus (Trimen, 1887)
Lepidochrysops titei Dickson, 1976
Lepidochrysops trimeni (Bethune-Baker, 1923)
Lepidochrysops turlini Stempffer, 1971
Lepidochrysops vansoni (Swanepoel, 1949)
Lepidochrysops variabilis Cottrell, 1965
Lepidochrysops vera Tite, 1961
Lepidochrysops victori Pringle, 1984
Lepidochrysops victoriae (Karsch, 1895)
Lepidochrysops violetta (Pinhey, 1945)
Lepidochrysops wykehami Tite, 1964
Lepidochrysops yvonnae Gardiner, 2004

References

Seitz, A. Die Gross-Schmetterlinge der Erde 13: Die Afrikanischen Tagfalter. Plate XIII 72
Seitz, A. Die Gross-Schmetterlinge der Erde 13: Die Afrikanischen Tagfalter. Plate XIII 73

 
Taxonomy articles created by Polbot
Lycaenidae genera